Suspense was a 1962–1963 BBC thriller anthology drama series. The series featured John Carson, Alex Scott as Dr. John Field, Margaret John as assistant matron and Desmond Llewelyn. 49 episodes were made, only two of which survive in full in the archives. An additional episode is incomplete.

References

External links
 

1962 British television series debuts
1963 British television series endings
BBC television dramas
1960s British anthology television series